The 1936 Paris–Nice was the fourth edition of the Paris–Nice cycle race and was held from 17 March to 22 March 1936. The race started in Paris and finished in Nice. The race was won by Maurice Archambaud.

General classification

References

1936
1936 in road cycling
1936 in French sport
March 1936 sports events